The 2000 North Carolina lieutenant gubernatorial election was held on 7 November 2000, as part of the elections to the Council of State.  North Carolina also held a gubernatorial election on the same day, but the offices of Governor and Lieutenant Governor are elected independently.

The election was won by Democrat Beverly Perdue, who succeeded fellow Democrat Dennis A. Wicker.  In the general election, Perdue defeated Republican former state senator Betsy Cochrane by 52% to 46%.

Primaries

Democratic primary

Republican primary

General election

Footnotes

Lieutenant Governor
2000 United States lieutenant gubernatorial elections
2000